Cape Bage is a prominent point on the coast between Murphy Bay and Ainsworth Bay. Discovered in 1912 by the Australasian Antarctic Expedition (1911–1914) under Douglas Mawson, who named it for Lieutenant R. Bage, the expedition's astronomer, assistant magnetician and recorder of tides.

Further reading 
 Defense Mapping Agency 1992, Sailing Directions (planning Guide) and (enroute) for Antarctica, P 410

External links 

 Cape Bage on USGS website
 Cape Bage on AADC website
 Cape Bage on SCAR website

References 

Headlands of George V Land